Yakovlevsky District is an administrative and municipal district (raion), one of the twenty-two in Primorsky Krai, Russia. It is located in the center of the krai. Its administrative center is the rural locality (a selo) of Yakovlevka. Population:  The population of Yakovlevka accounts for 27.9% of the district's total population.

References

Notes

Sources

Districts of Primorsky Krai